MFC 23: Unstoppable was a mixed martial arts event held by the Maximum Fighting Championship (MFC) on December 4th, 2009 at the River Cree Resort and Casino in Enoch, Alberta. The main event featured former UFC contender Thales Leites taking on fellow UFC veteran Dean Lister. The co-main event featured Jason MacDonald taking on Solomon Hutcherson. The event aired live on HDNet.

Fight Card

See also
 Maximum Fighting Championship
 List of Maximum Fighting Championship events
 2009 in Maximum Fighting Championship

References

23
2009 in mixed martial arts
Mixed martial arts in Canada
Sport in Alberta
2009 in Canadian sports